Jens Wahl (born 24 July 1966) is a German former footballer.

Career

Wahl began his career with FC Hansa Rostock in the DDR-Oberliga, and won one cap for East Germany. After reunification, Hansa won the final, transitional East German championship, and the cup, with Wahl scoring the winner in the final. He later played for Chemnitzer FC, FC St. Gallen and Dynamo Dresden.

References

External links

 
 
 

1966 births
Living people
German footballers
East German footballers
East Germany international footballers
Association football defenders
Association football midfielders
FC Hansa Rostock players
Chemnitzer FC players
FC St. Gallen players
Dynamo Dresden players
DDR-Oberliga players